The Ministry of Mines and Energy (MME) is a Brazilian government ministry established in 1960. It fosters investments in mining and energy-related activities, funds research and sets out government policies. Previously, mines and energy were the responsibility of the Ministry of Agriculture. , the minister of mines and energy is Alexandre Silveira.

References

External links
 Office of the Minister of Mines and Energy 

Brazil
Mines and Energy
Brazil
Ministries established in 1960
1960 establishments in Brazil